St Paul's College, formerly St Paul's Technical College and St Paul's Technical School, was a Catholic boys school in Ballarat.

History

In 1948, the Bishop of Ballarat, James O'Collins established St Paul's Technical College, inviting the Christian Brothers to continue their work for boys through the provision of technical education.

In 1960, Alice Fanning bequeathed property in Mt Clear to the Sisters of Mercy. In 1967 the land was developed for a senior school for girls from Sacred Heart College, named St Martin's in the Pines. The school became co-educational in 1988, with many boys in the senior years of St Paul's attending St Martin's in the Pines.

In 1987, the school moved from Lydiard Street's Ludbrook House to the former Ballarat Orphanage on Victoria Street.

In 1995, the College amalgamated with Sacred Heart College and St Martin's in the Pines to form Damascus College Ballarat.

Student abuse scandals

In 2014 St Paul's was named on Ballarat's child sexual abuse survivors’ group submission to the Royal Commission into Institutional Responses to Child Sexual Abuse, along with other Christian Brothers Schools St Patrick's College, St Joseph's College and Emmanuel College. Also named were De La Salle College and Geelong Grammar School.

Notable alumni 
 Geoff Cunningham (1977), AFL footballer for St Kilda
 Daryl Cunningham (1978), AFL footballer
 Anthony McDonald (1990), former AFL footballer for Melbourne
 James McDonald (1992) AFL footballer for Melbourne and Greater Western Sydney
 Mick Malthouse (1971), AFL footballer and coach for Footscray, West Coast Eagles, Collingwood and Carlton
 Maurice O'Keefe (1972), AFL footballer for St Kilda and Geelong
 Val Perovic (1971), former AFL footballer for St Kilda and Carlton
 Sean Simpson (1987), former AFL footballer for St Kilda and Geelong

Principals

References

External links
 St Paul's College website

Defunct boys' schools in Australia
Buildings and structures in Ballarat
Defunct Catholic schools in Australia
1948 establishments in Australia
1994 disestablishments in Australia
Defunct schools in Victoria (Australia)
Educational institutions established in 1948
Educational institutions disestablished in 1994
Former Congregation of Christian Brothers schools in Australia